SNC-Lavalin Rail & Transit (Interfleet Technology until 2015) is an international rail consultancy company headquartered in Derby, England. It was founded in 1994.
In October 2011 the company was acquired by SNC-Lavalin. In January 2016 the company was renamed when it became integrated under the main SNC-Lavalin brand.

History

Formation and early years
Interfleet Technology was formed in April 1994, as part of the privatisation of British Rail. Interfleet originated from the former InterCity Fleet Engineering division of the British Rail engineering and technical headquarters, which managed the rolling stock operated by the then InterCity sector of British Rail. From April 1994 to March 1996, the company traded as a subsidiary of the British Railways Board, then in March 1996, Interfleet was privatised by means of a Management and Employee Buy-Out, led by its directors. At the time of privatisation, the firm employed 99 staff and had one office in Derby. Turnover at that time was approximately £5 million. In October 2011, Interfleet was acquired by the SNC-Lavalin Group.

Rebranding and integration of Interfleet
In January 2016, Interfleet Technology was re-branded as SNC-Lavalin Rail & Transit. This integration also brought together SNC-Lavalin's Transit Engineers in Vancouver and Toronto and the Transport Systems team in Montreal to form a new group SNC-Lavalin Rail & Transit.

Former logo
The company logo for Interfleet has also changed throughout its history as shown below.

Organisational structure and regional offices
The international SNC-Lavalin Rail & Transit divisional unit has regional subsidiaries in the United Kingdom, North America, Scandinavia and Australasia. The divisional unit has offices in Australia (Brisbane, Melbourne, Perth and Sydney), Canada (Burlington, Montreal, Toronto & Vancouver), Malaysia (Kuala Lumpur), Norway (Oslo), Sweden (8 locations including Gothenburg, Malmö and Stockholm), the United Kingdom (Derby (HQ)), Edinburgh, Glasgow, Birmingham, London and Manchester) and the United States (Philadelphia & New York City) and 1,000 staff.

Service areas
SNC-Lavalin Rail & Transit provides services across the railway system, the major elements of which include rolling stock, infrastructure, signalling, communications, testing, and software development. The company works throughout all stages of the asset lifecycle, from feasibility, specification and procurement, through operations, maintenance and renewal. Services offered range from strategic railway management through to engineering and detail technical services.

Clients and assignments
SNC-Lavalin Rail & Transit works throughout the international rail industry. Clients include governmental and regulatory agencies and private clients including manufacturers and maintainers, operators and owners as well as banks, investors and international development agencies. Assignments undertaken range from day-to-day engineering and technical support, through to management of major projects such as new train procurement and strategic support to bidders for passenger rail franchises.

In November 2015, SNC-Lavalin Rail & Transit in partnership with Arup Group and Ernst & Young was appointed by the Department for Transport as its operator of last resort to takeover the operations of any train operating company in the United Kingdom at short notice should it be required. This function used to be handled by Directly Operated Railways. In June 2018, the partnership trading as London North Eastern Railway took over the InterCity East Coast franchise from Virgin Trains East Coast.

References

Post-privatisation British railway companies
Railway companies established in 1994
Railway companies of the United Kingdom
Service companies of the United Kingdom
1994 establishments in England